The  was an anti-aircraft gun used by the Imperial Japanese Army during World War II. The Type 99's number was designated for the year the gun was accepted, 2599 in the Japanese imperial year calendar (1939 in the Gregorian calendar).

History and development
During the Battle of Nanjing in the Second Sino-Japanese War, Japanese forces captured a number of German-made SK C/30 anti-aircraft guns from the National Revolutionary Army of the Republic of China. These weapons were originally naval anti-aircraft weapons for the Third Reich's Kriegsmarine, and should not be confused with the more famous FlaK 88 mm anti-aircraft gun.

Quickly realizing the superiority of this design in terms of range and firepower over the domestic Type 88 75 mm AA gun, the Japanese Army Technical Bureau quickly reverse engineered it, and placed it into production. Approximately 1000 units were built.

Design
The Type 99 88 mm AA gun had a mono-block gun barrel, semi-automatic vertical sliding breech block, and hydro-pneumatic recoil mechanism. The firing platform was supported by five legs, each of which (along with the central pedestal) had adjustable screwed foot for leveling. The gun barrel could easily be removed from the breech end-piece, and the entire assembly could be broken down into six separate assemblies for ease of transportation. Armor-piercing shells were also developed for potential anti-tank use.

Projectiles
 High-explosive –　
 Incendiary – 
 Armor-piercing –

Combat record
The Type 99 88 mm AA gun was primarily deployed in defense of the Japanese home islands against Allied air raids and against the perceived threat of Allied invasion.

References

Notes

Bibliography
 War Department TM-E-30-480 Handbook on Japanese Military Forces September 1944
 Bishop, Chris (eds) The Encyclopedia of Weapons of World War II. Barnes & Nobel. 1998. 
 Chant, Chris. Artillery of World War II, Zenith Press, 2001, 
 McLean, Donald B. Japanese Artillery; Weapons and Tactics. Wickenburg, Ariz.: Normount Technical Publications 1973. .
 Rottman, Gordon L. The Japanese Army in World War II. Osprey (2005)

External links
Taki's Imperial Japanese Army
NavWeapons.com

Artillery of Japan
88 mm artillery
World War II anti-aircraft guns
9
9
Military equipment introduced in the 1930s